Butuzov is a Russian masculine surname originating from the nickname butuz, which refers to a short, fat person; its feminine counterpart is Butusova. The surname may refer to the following notable people:
Lyudmila Butuzova (born 1957), Soviet high jumper
Natalya Butuzova (born 1954), Soviet archer

See also
Butusov

References

Russian-language surnames